Christopher Charles Heyde AM (20 April 1939, in Sydney – 6 March 2008, in Canberra) was a prominent Australian statistician who did leading research in probability, stochastic processes and statistics.

Heyde was a professor at Columbia University, the University of Melbourne, CSIRO, University of Manchester, University of Sheffield, Michigan State University, and The Australian National University, Canberra.

In 2008, Heyde died of metastatic melanoma.

Honours
 1972 – Member of the International Statistical Institute
 1973 – Fellow of the Institute of Mathematical Statistics
 1977 – Fellow of the Australian Academy of Science (FAA)
 1981 – Honorary Life Member of the Statistical Society of Australia Inc. (SSAI)
 1988 – Awarded the Statistical Society of Australia's Pitman Medal and served as President of the Society
 1994 – Shared the Australian Academy of Science's Hannan Medal with Peter Hall.
 1995 – Thomas Ranken Lyle Medal of the Australian Academy of Science.
 1998 – D.Sc. honoris causa, University of Sydney
 2003 – Fellow of the Academy of the Social Sciences in Australia (FASSA)
 2003 – Appointed Member of the Order of Australia (AM) "for service to mathematics, particularly through research into statistics and probability, and to the advancement of learning in these disciplines".

Offices held
 Vice President of the International Statistical Institute
 President of the Bernoulli Society
 President of the Statistical Society of Australia (1979–1981)
 Vice President of the Australian Mathematical Society
 Editor of the Australian Journal of Statistics
 Editor of Stochastic Processes and Their Applications (1983–1989)
 Editor-in-chief of Journal of Applied Probability (1990–2008)
 Editor-in-chief of Advances in Applied Probability (1990–2008).

References

External links
 
 Memoir full transcription from Historical Records of Australian Science, vol.20, no.1, 2009

1939 births
2008 deaths
Probability theorists
Australian statisticians
Academic staff of the Australian National University
Members of the Order of Australia
Fellows of the Australian Academy of Science
Fellows of the Academy of the Social Sciences in Australia
People educated at Barker College
Michigan State University faculty
Academics of the University of Sheffield